Creamery Package (formerly Hitt) is an unincorporated community in Scott Township, Mississippi County, Arkansas, United States. It is north of Interstate 55, exit 36 and southeast of Dyess.

References

Unincorporated communities in Mississippi County, Arkansas
Unincorporated communities in Arkansas